Waterloo High School is a high school in Waterloo, Alabama in Lauderdale County, Alabama. The high school is a public school in the Lauderdale County School System under the Alabama State Board of Education. The high school has grades Kindergarten - Twelfth grade in one building. It has about 250-350 students in a school year. The current building was constructed in 1986.

Sports
The school has six sports: Baseball, softball, cross country, volleyball, basketball, and football. They compete in the Alabama High School Athletic Association division 1A. The mascot is the Cougar. Previous mascots include the Stripes (for Striped Bass) and the Bulldog.

The school has won state titles in the following sports:

Girls Basketball: 1990
Girls Fast Pitch Softball: 2003, 2005, 2006
Girls Slow Pitch softball: 1993, 1994, 1995, 1997, 2001
Boys Baseball: 1990

References

External links
 
 Alabama High School Athletic Association
 Waterloo-Al.com

Public high schools in Alabama
Schools in Lauderdale County, Alabama
School buildings completed in 1986
1986 establishments in Alabama